David ben Abraham al-Fasi was a medieval Jewish, Moroccan lexicographer and grammarian from Fez, living in the second half of the 10th century (died before 1026 CE), who eventually settled in the Land of Israel where he is believed to have composed his magnum opus. He belonged to the sect of the Karaites, and displayed skills as a grammarian and commentator.

Al-Fasi was the author of Kitāb Jāmiʿ al-Alfāẓ ("The Book of Collected Meanings"), one of the earliest known Judeo-Arabic Dictionaries, a work which defines words in the Hebrew Bible. It is the first dictionary of biblical Hebrew. He classifies the roots according to the number of their letters, as did the grammarians prior to Judah Hayyūj.

Method of elucidation
Scholars have pointed out that David ben Abraham al-Fasi, in all the controversies between the Rabbanites (rabbanim) and the Karaites (maskilim), invariably sides with the latter, often criticizing the views of the former. His method is concise, bringing down the definition of words as understood by his contemporaries, without mentioning them by name. The only authority that he mentions by name (twice) is Saadia Gaon, whom he calls Al-Fayyumi. Although in many cases, Al-Fasi's method of elucidation is similar to that of Saadia Gaon, in other areas of elucidation he does not withhold his criticism from Saadia Gaon's method, without naming him explicitly. Early rabbinic sources, such as the Aramaic Targum of Onkelos and of Jonathan ben Uzziel are alluded to by his use of such titles as al-Targum, al-Suriani and al-Mutarjim.

In Hebrew grammar, al-Fasi is known to have distinguished between the “šoršiyyot” (radical letters; lexical roots) and the “šimušiyyot” (theoretical roots; servile letters), but gave to them no mnemonics.

Anecdotes on Jewish history
Al-Fasi records that Jews, following the Muslim conquest of Jerusalem, were permitted to pray at the gates of the Temple Mount, which hitherto had been denied Jews living under the Byzantines.

Al-Fasi's dictionary was later abridged by the philologist Levi b. Yefet, a native of Jerusalem, and his abridgment was, in turn, epitomized by 'Alī b. Suleimān, also of Jerusalem.

Partially preserved works
Translations of the Pentateuch (Mss. Brit. Lib. Or. 2403 [§ 304], 2494 [§ 318], fols. 1r–30v, 2495 [§ 306], 2561 [§ 305], fols. 1r–74v, 2562 [§ 307]; JTSA 8916; RNL Yevr.-Arab. I 4803; T-S Ar. 21.133)
Ecclesiastes and Lamentations (Ms. Brit. Lib. Or. 2552 [§ 299], fols. 90r–141v))

References

Further reading
 

Moroccan writers
Moroccan lexicographers
10th-century writers
People from Fez, Morocco
10th-century Moroccan writers
10th-century Jews
10th-century Moroccan people
Medieval Moroccan Jews
Jewish grammarians
Linguists of Hebrew
Grammarians of Hebrew
Medieval Hebraists
Jewish lexicographers
Karaite Jews